Cardiovascular Diabetology is a peer-reviewed open access medical journal covering the intersection of cardiology and diabetology, meaning the connection between diabetes, metabolic syndrome and cardiovascular diseases. It is published by BioMed Central (a part of Springer Nature since 2008) and was established in 2002, with Enrique Fisman (Tel Aviv University) and Alexander Tenenbaum (Sheba Medical Center) as founding editors-in-chief. Articles are published online upon acceptance, rather than in issues. A printed version is periodically distributed in India by Panacea Biotec Ltd.

Scope 
Cardiovascular Diabetology considers for publications manuscripts on all aspects of the diabetes/cardiovascular interrelationship, including clinical, genetic, experimental, pharmacological, epidemiological, molecular biology and laboratory research. Seven article types maybe considered for publication: original investigations, reviews, case reports, commentaries, hypotheses,
methodology articles and study protocols; most of published papers are original investigations.

Abstracting and indexing 
The journal is abstracted and indexed in Chemical Abstracts Service (CAS), Citebase, Current Contents, Directory of Open Access Journals (DOAJ), EMBASE, MEDLINE/PubMed, Science Citation Index, SCImago Journal Rank, Scopus and Socolar. According to the Journal Citation Reports, the journal has a 2020 impact factor of 9.951, ranking it in the 93.45 JIF percentile (10 out of 145 journals) in the category of “Endocrinology & Metabolism”, and in the 90.49 JIF percentile (14 out of 142 journals) in the category "Cardiac & Cardiovascular Systems”   journals.

References

External links 
 

Cardiology journals
Endocrinology journals
BioMed Central academic journals
Creative Commons-licensed journals
English-language journals
Publications established in 2002